The Compañía Electro-Siderúrgica e Industrial de Valdivia also known by its acronyms ESVAL is an iron and steel industry located at Valdivia in Chile. The enterprise is considered the inheritor of Altos Hornos y Acerías de Corral whose infrastructure it bought in 1926 when it was created by entrepreneurs from Valdivia.

References

Ironworks and steelworks in Chile
Steel companies of Chile
Companies based in Los Ríos Region
Valdivia
Manufacturing companies established in 1926
Chilean companies established in 1926